The Micuș is a left tributary of the river Hășdate in Romania. It flows into the Hășdate in Petreștii de Jos.

References

Rivers of Romania
Rivers of Cluj County